Sir John Park Campbell, OBE (born 1934) is a Scottish farmer and businessperson.

Early life 
Born in 1934, Campbell and his brother began farming at the age of 15 as tenants on a hill farm in Argyll; having met with success, they were eventually able to buy the land.

Glenrath Farms 
In 1957, Campbell married Catherine Kent, the daughter of poultry farmers. That year, he started rearing poultry (with 113 hens) from his wife's farm. At the age of 27, he and his wife moved to Glenrath Farm near Peebles. It was not an immediate success, and he had to sell part of the farm but his fortunes reversed and in 1970 he acquired another poultry farm. He eventually secured a contract with a Scottish supermarket, which later merged into Tesco. By 2010, Glenarth Farms (of which is Campbell is chairman) operate on 12,000 acres of land and produces 1.4 million eggs a day; 75% of these are sold to Tesco and 25% to Asda.

Public service 
Alongside his business work, Campbell sat on Tweeddale District Council between 1975 and 1993.

Honours and awards 
Campbell was appointed an Officer of the Order of the British Empire (OBE) in the 2000 New Year Honours "for services to the Poultry Industry". He was knighted in the 2017 New Year Honours for "services to farming and charitable service to entrepreneurship".

References 

Living people
1934 births
Scottish farmers
Scottish businesspeople
Knights Bachelor
Officers of the Order of the British Empire